KRSQ (101.9 FM) is a commercial radio station in Laurel, Montana, serving the Billings, Montana area. The station airs a CHR music format branded as “Hot 101-9”. Licensed to Laurel, Montana, United States, the station serves the Billings area.  The station is currently owned by Radio Billings, LLC.

On-Air
The Big J Show - Mornings
Kyle - Afternoons
The Baka Boyz - Friday Nights
American Top 40 with Ryan Seacrest - Sunday Mornings

Imaging

Station Voice: Saint John

Station Jingles: TM EVO CHR with the Kiss FM logo.

References

External links
Official Website

 http://www.allaccess.com/search?q=twang+105

RSQ
Contemporary hit radio stations in the United States
Radio stations established in 1994
1994 establishments in Montana